Dionisotti is a surname. Notable people with the surname include:

Carlo Dionisotti (1908–1998), Italian literary critic, philologist, and essayist
Paola Dionisotti (born 1946), Italian-British actress 

Italian-language surnames